RMS Empress of Japan may refer to the following ships:

 , operated by Canadian Pacific Steamships 1891–1922.
 , operated by Canadian Pacific Steamships 1930–1942.

Ship names